Condottieri (singular condottiero or condottiere) were Italian captains in command of mercenary companies during the Middle Ages and of multinational armies during the early modern period. They notably served popes and other European monarchs during the Italian Wars of the Renaissance and the European Wars of Religion. Notable condottieri include Prospero Colonna, Giovanni dalle Bande Nere, Cesare Borgia, the Marquis of Pescara, Andrea Doria, and the Duke of Parma.

The term condottiero in medieval Italian originally meant "contractor" since the condotta was the contract by which the condottieri put themselves in the service of a city or of a lord. The term, however, became a synonym of "military leader" during the Renaissance and Reformation era. Some authors have described the legendary Alberto da Giussano as the "first condottiero" and Napoleon Bonaparte (in virtue of his Italian origins) as the "last condottiero". According to this view, the condottieri tradition would span a huge diverse period from the battle of Legnano in 1176 to the Battle of Waterloo in 1815.

Mercenary captains

Background

In the thirteenth and fourteenth centuries, the Italian city-states of Venice, Florence, and Genoa were very rich from their trade with the Levant, yet possessed woefully small armies. In the event that foreign powers and envious neighbours attacked, the ruling nobles hired foreign mercenaries to fight for them. The military-service terms and conditions were stipulated in a condotta (contract) between the city-state and the soldiers (officer and enlisted man), thus, the contracted leader, the mercenary captain commanding, was titled the Condottiere.

From the eleventh to the thirteenth century, European soldiers led by professional officers fought against the Muslims in the Crusades (1095–1291). These crusading officers provided large-scale warfare combat experience in the Holy Land. On the Crusades' conclusion, the first  (bands of roving soldiers; plural: masnade) appeared in Italy. These  were not Italian, but (mostly) Flemings, from the Duchy of Brabant (hence), and from Aragon. The latter were Spanish soldiers who had followed King Peter III of Aragon in the War of the Sicilian Vespers in Italy in October 1282, and, post-war, remained there, seeking military employment. The first well organised mercenaries in Italy were the Ventura Companies of Duke Werner von Urslingen and Count Konrad von Landau. Werner's company differed from other mercenary companies because its code of military justice imposed discipline and an equal division of the contract's income. The Ventura Company increased in number until becoming the fearsome "Great Company" of some 3,000  (each  comprised a knight and a sergeant).

Rise
The first mercenary company with an Italian as its chief was the "Company of St. George" formed in 1339 and led by Lodrisio Visconti. This company was defeated and destroyed by Luchino Visconti of Milan (another condottiero and uncle of Lodrisio) in April 1339. Later, in 1377, a second "Company of St. George" was formed under the leadership of Alberico da Barbiano, also an Italian and the Count of Conio, who later taught military science to condottieri such as Braccio da Montone and Giacomuzzo Attendolo Sforza, who also served in the company.

Once aware of their military power monopoly in Italy, the condottieri bands became notorious for their capriciousness, and soon dictated terms to their ostensible employers. In turn, many condottieri, such as Braccio da Montone and Muzio Sforza, became powerful politicians. As most were educated men acquainted with Roman military science manuals (e.g. Vegetius's Epitoma rei militarii), they began viewing warfare from the perspective of military science, rather than as a matter of valour or physical courage—a great, consequential departure from chivalry, the traditional medieval model of soldiering. Consequently, the condottieri fought by outmanoeuvring the opponent and fighting his ability to wage war, rather than risking uncertain fortune—defeat, capture, death—in battlefield combat.

The earlier, medieval condottieri developed the "art of war" (military strategy and tactics) into military science more than any of their historical military predecessors—fighting indirectly, not directly—thus, only reluctantly endangering themselves and their enlisted men, avoiding battle when possible, also avoiding hard work and winter campaigns, as these all reduced the total number of trained soldiers available, and were detrimental to their political and economic interest. Niccolò Machiavelli even said that condottieri fought each other in grandiose, but often pointless and near-bloodless battles. However, later in the Renaissance the condottieri line of battle still deployed the grand armoured knight and medieval weapons and tactics after most European powers had begun employing professional standing armies of pikemen and musketeers; this helped to contribute to their eventual decline and destruction.

In 1347, Cola di Rienzo (Tribune and effective dictator of the city) had Werner von Urslingen executed in Rome, and Konrad von Landau assumed command of the Great Company. On the conclusion (1360) of the Peace of Bretigny between England and France, Sir John Hawkwood led an army of English mercenaries, called the White Company, into Italy, which took a prominent part in the confused wars of the next thirty years. Towards the end of the century, the Italians began to organize armies of the same description. This ended the reign of the purely mercenary company and began that of the semi-national mercenary army which endured in Europe till replaced by the national standing army system. In 1363, Count von Landau was betrayed by his Hungarian soldiers, and defeated in combat, by the White Company's more advanced tactics under commanders Albert Sterz and John Hawkwood.

From the fifteenth century hence, most condottieri were landless Italian nobles who had chosen the profession of arms as a livelihood; the most famous of such mercenary captains was the son of Caterina Sforza, Giovanni dalle Bande Nere, from Forlì, known as The Last Condottiere; his son was Cosimo I de' Medici, Grand Duke of Tuscany; besides noblemen, princes also fought as condottieri, given the sizable income to their estates, notably Sigismondo Pandolfo Malatesta, Lord of Rimini, and Federico da Montefeltro, Duke of Urbino; despite war-time inflation, soldier's pay was high:
 1,900 monthly florins in 1432: Micheletto Attendolo (Florence)
 6,600 monthly florins in 1448: William VIII of Montferrat, from Francesco Sforza (Milan); the enlisted soldier's pay was 3,300 florins, half that of an officer's
 33,000 yearly scudi for 250 men in 1505: Francesco II Gonzaga (Florence)
 100,000 yearly scudi for 200 men in 1505: Francesco Maria I della Rovere (Florence)

If the  expired definitively, the condottiere could not declare war against the contracting city-state for two years. This military–business custom was respected because professional reputation (business credibility) was everything to the condottieri; a deceived employer was a reputation ruined; likewise, for maritime mercenaries, whose  (contract of assent) stipulated naval military-service terms and conditions; sea captains and sailors so-contracted were called . Their principal employers were Genoa and the Papal States, beginning in the fourteenth century, yet Venice considered it humiliating to so employ military sailors, and did not use naval mercenaries, even during the greatest danger in the city's history.

In fifteenth-century Italy, the condottieri were masterful lords of war; during the wars in Lombardy, Machiavelli observed:

In 1487, at Calliano, the Venetians successfully met and acquitted themselves against the German landsknechte and the Swiss infantry, who then were the best soldiers in Europe.

Decline

In time, the financial and political interests of the condottieri proved serious drawbacks to decisive, bloody warfare: the mercenary captains often were treacherous, tending to avoid combat, and "resolve" fights with a bribe—either for the opponent or for themselves. Towards the end of the 15th century, when the large cities had gradually swallowed up the small states, and Italy itself was drawn into the general current of European politics, and became the battlefield of powerful armies—French, Spanish and German—the venture captains, who in the end proved quite unequal to the gendarmerie of France and the improved troops of the Italian states, gradually disappeared.
 
The soldiers of the condottieri were almost entirely heavy armoured cavalry (men-at-arms). Before 1400, they had little or nothing in common with the people among whom they fought, and their disorderly conduct and rapacity seem often to have exceeded that of medieval armies. They were always ready to change sides at the prospect of higher pay—the enemy of today might be the comrade-in-arms of tomorrow. Further, a prisoner was always more valuable than a dead enemy. As a consequence, their battles were often as bloodless as they were theatrical.

The age of firearms and weapons utilizing gunpowder further contributed to the decline of the condottieri. Although the mercenary forces were among the first to adapt to the emerging technologies on the battlefield, ultimately, the advent of firearms-governed warfare rendered their ceremonial fighting style obsolete. When battlefields shifted from chivalric confrontations characterized by ostentatious displays of power to an everyman's war, they were ill-prepared to adjust.

Captain generals
In 1494, the French king Charles VIII's royal army invaded the Italian peninsula, initiating the Italian Wars. The most renowned condottieri fought for foreign powers: Gian Giacomo Trivulzio abandoned Milan for France, while Andrea Doria was Admiral of the Holy Roman Emperor Charles V. In the end, failure was political, rather than military, stemming from disunity and political indecision, and, by 1550, the military service condotta had disappeared, while the term condottiere remained current, denominating the great Italian generals (mainly) fighting for foreign states; men such as Gian Giacomo Medici, Ambrogio Spinola, Alexander Farnese, Marcantonio II Colonna, Raimondo Montecuccoli and Prospero Colonna were prominent into the sixteenth and the seventeenth centuries. The political practice of hiring foreign mercenaries, however, did not end.  For example, the Vatican’s Swiss Guard are the modern remnants of a historically effective mercenary army.

The end of the Thirty Years' War in 1648 and the birth of Westphalian sovereignty diminished Roman Catholic influence in Europe and led to the consolidation of large states, while Italy was fragmented and divided. The condottieri tradition greatly suffered the political and strategic decline of Italy and never recovered.

List 

 Roger de Flor (c. 1268–1305)
 Malatesta da Verucchio (1212–1312)
 Castruccio Castracani, Lord of Lucca (1281–1328)
 Cangrande della Scala (1291–1329)
 Montréal d'Albarno  (c. 1315–1354)
 Walter VI of Brienne (c. 1304–1356)
 Konrad von Landau (died 22 April 1363)
 Albert Sterz (executed 1366)
 John Hawkwood (Giovanni Acuto, c. 1320–1394)
 Giovanni Ordelaffi from Forlì (1355–1399)
 Astorre I Manfredi (1345–1405)
 Alberico da Barbiano (1344–1409)
 Johann II (Habsburg-Laufenburg) (c. 1330–1380)
 Facino Cane de Casale (c. 1360–1412)
 Angelo Broglio da Lavello, also known as Tartaglia (1350 or 1370–1421)
 Andrea Fortebracci, better known as Braccio da Montone (1368–1424)
 Muzio Attendolo, also called Sforza (Strong) (1369–1424)
 Francesco Bussone da Carmagnola  (1390–1432)
 Giovanni Vitelleschi (d. 1440)
 Erasmo da Narni, also known as Gattamelata (1370–1443)
 Niccolò Piccinino (1380–1444)
 Micheletto Attendolo (Muzio Attendolo's cousin or nephew, c. 1390–c. 1451)
 Francesco Sforza (1401–1466)
 Onorata Rodiani (1403–1452)
 Sigismondo Pandolfo Malatesta (1417–1468)
 Bartolomeo Colleoni (c. 1400–1475)
 Federico III da Montefeltro (1422–1482)
 Francesco Alidosi (1455–1511)
 Vitellozzo Vitelli (1458–1502)
 Oliverotto Euffreducci (1475–1502)
 Niccolò di Pitigliano (d. 1510)
 Ettore Fieramosca (1479–1515)
 Cesare Borgia (1475–1507)
 Prospero Colonna (1452–1523)
 Bartolomeo d'Alviano (1455–1515)
 Gian Giacomo Trivulzio (c. 1441–1518)
 Piero Strozzi (1510–1558)
 Andrea Doria (1466–1560)
 Marquis of Pescara (1489–1525)
Marquis of Vasto (1502–1546)
 Giovanni dalle Bande Nere (1498–1526)
 Ferrante Gonzaga (1507–1557)
 Alexander Farnese (1545–1592)
 Torquato Conti (1591–1636)
 Ambrogio Spinola (1569–1630)
 Ottavio Piccolomini (1599–1656)
 Raimondo Montecuccoli (1609–1680)

Principal battles
Battle of Montecatini (1315)
Battle of Parabiago (1339) – Lodrisio Visconti's "Company of St. George", for Verona, against Luchino Visconti and Ettore da Panigo for Milan
Battle of Cascina (1364)
War of the Eight Saints (1375–1378)
Cesena Bloodbath (1377) – Papal and Breton mercenaries under John Hawkwood slaughtered more than 2,000 citizens of Cesena.
Battle of Castagnaro (1387) – Giovanni Ordelaffi, for Verona, against John Hawkwood, for Padova.
Battle of Casalecchio (1402) – Alberico da Barbiano, for Milan, against Muzio Attendolo and others for the Bolognese-Florentine league.
Battle of Motta (1412) 
Battle of Sant'Egidio (1416) – Braccio da Montone, for himself, against Carlo I Malatesta, for Perugia.
Battle of Maclodio (1427) – Count of Carmagnola, for Venice, against Carlo I Malatesta, for Milan.
Battle of San Romano (1432) – Niccolò da Tolentino, for Florence, against Francesco Piccinino, for Siena.
Battle of Anghiari (1440) – Niccolò Piccinino, for Milan, against Florence, Papal States and Venice, under Micheletto Attendolo.
Battle of Bosco Marengo (1447) 
Battle of Molinella (1467)
Battle of Crevola (1487) 
Battle of Fornovo (1495) – The Italian League against Charles VIII of France
Battle of Agnadello (1509) – Bartolomeo d'Alviano, for Venice, against France and the Italian League.
Battle of Pavia (1525) – Fernando d'Avalos for the Empire of Charles V against France.
Battle of Marciano (1554) – Gian Giacomo Medici for Florence and the Holy Roman Empire against Piero Strozzi for Siena and France.
Fall of Antwerp (1585) – Alexander Farnese for Catholic Spain against Dutch Protestants and England
Siege of Paris (1590) – Alexander Farnese for the Catholic League against Royal France, England and the Huguenots
Palatinate campaign (1620–1622) – Ambrogio Spinola for Spain and Holy Roman Empire against the Electorate of Palatinate
 The Wars of Castro (1641–1649) – between popes Urban VIII and Innocent X and the Duchy of Parma.

References

Sources
Machiavelli, Niccolò. History of Florence. book I, ch. vii.(on-line text)
Rendina, Claudio (1992). I Capitani di ventura. Newton Compton.
Ricotti, Ercole (1844–1845). Storia delle compagnie di ventura in Italia, 4 vols.
Lenman, B., Anderson, T., eds. (2000). Chambers Dictionary of World History, Edinburgh: Chambers Harrap Publishers Ltd., 
 
Димов, Г. Войната в италийските земи през късното Средновековие: кондотиерите – В: сп. Алманах, I, 2015, 30–43.

External links

Adrian Fletcher's Paradoxplace Condottieri Statues & Paintings 
Condottieri di ventura – a complete database about Condottieri operating in Italy between 1300–1550 

 
Mercenary units and formations of the Middle Ages
16th century in Italy
Medieval Italy
Warfare of the Middle Ages